Aleksandr Borisovich Vasilyev (born 1 March 1990) is a Russian former professional football player.

Club career
He made his Russian Football National League debut for FC Mordovia Saransk on 30 March 2010 in a game against FC Irtysh Omsk.

External links
 Career summary by sportbox.ru

1990 births
People from Sergachsky District
Living people
Russian footballers
Association football defenders
Association football forwards
FC Gornyak Uchaly players
FC Mordovia Saransk players
FC KAMAZ Naberezhnye Chelny players
FC Volga Ulyanovsk players
Sportspeople from Nizhny Novgorod Oblast